Yōkaichiba Tōshō-gū (八日市場東照宮) is a Shinto shrine in Yōkaichiba, Chiba Prefecture, Japan. It enshrines the first Shōgun of the Tokugawa Shogunate, Tokugawa Ieyasu.

See also 
Tōshō-gū
List of Tōshō-gū

Shinto shrines in Chiba Prefecture